is a private women's college in Kobe, Hyōgo, Japan. The predecessor of the school was founded in 1940, and it was chartered as a university in 1966.

It has three campuses:
 in Sannomiya
 on Port Island 
 in Suma (main campus)

See also
Kobe Women's Junior College

External links

 Official website 

Educational institutions established in 1940
Private universities and colleges in Japan
Universities and colleges in Hyōgo Prefecture
1940 establishments in Japan
Women's universities and colleges in Japan